The Beckwith Ranch is a historic cattle ranch in the Wet Mountain Valley of Custer County, Colorado, USA. The headquarters spread over eleven buildings, ten of which have been listed on the National Register of Historic Places since May 20, 1998. It was established by Elton and Edwin Beckwith, two brothers from Mount Desert Island, Maine.

References

Ranches on the National Register of Historic Places in Colorado
Victorian architecture in Colorado
Houses in Custer County, Colorado
National Register of Historic Places in Custer County, Colorado
Historic districts on the National Register of Historic Places in Colorado